The 1992 Winter Paralympics were the fifth Winter Paralympics. They were the first Winter Paralympics to be celebrated with the International Olympic Committee cooperation. They were also the first ever Paralympics or a Winter Parasports event held in France. They were held at the resort of Tignes as a support venue of the main host city Albertville, France, from 25 March to 1 April 1992. For the first time, demonstration events in Alpine and Nordic Skiing for athletes with an intellectual disability and Biathlon for athletes with a visual impairment were held.

Sports 
The games consisted of 79 events in three disciplines of two sports.

 Alpine skiing
 Nordic skiing
 Biathlon
 Cross-country skiing

Medal table

The top 10 NPCs by number of gold medals are listed below. The host nation (France) is highlighted.

Participating nations
Twenty four nations participated in the 1992 Winter Paralympics. Germany became an independent country after their reunification while Soviet Union was in the process of their country's dissolution. Estonia, Liechtenstein and South Korea made their debut appearances at the Winter Games.

 (Host nation)

Mascot

The official mascot was Alpy, designed by Vincent Thiebaut, represented the summit of the Grande Motte mountain in Tignes. Alpy was shown on a mono-ski to demonstrate its athleticism and the colours of white, green and blue were used to represent purity/snow, hope/nature and discipline/the lake. The bird logo was designed by Jean-Michel Folon.

See also

 1992 Winter Olympics
 1992 Summer Paralympics

References

External links
International Paralympic Committee
The event at SVT's open archive 

 
1992 in multi-sport events
International sports competitions hosted by France
1992
1992 in French sport
Sport in Albertville
Multi-sport events in France
March 1992 sports events in Europe
April 1992 sports events in Europe
Paralympics 1992